Patrick Bartley (24 March 1909 – 25 June 1956) was a British coal miner, civil servant and politician. He served as Labour Party Member of Parliament for Chester-le-Street from 1950 until his early death.

Mining career
Bartley was born in Washington, then in County Durham. He went to St Joseph's Elementary School in the town, leaving at the age of 14 to become a coalminer. He spent his spare time studying, and in 1930 he was accepted for a two-year course at the Catholic Workers' College, which was attached to the University of Oxford.

Politics
From 1933 Bartley was Branch Secretary of the Mineworkers' union at his pit. He also became active in politics in the Labour Party, and in 1934 was elected to Washington Urban District Council. In 1937 he was elected instead to Durham County Council, on which he served for 12 years. He also acted as agent to Jack Lawson, the Labour Member of Parliament for Chester-le-Street.

Civil service
In 1942, Bartley left the coal face to become Assistant Labour Director at the Northern "B" Region of the Ministry of Fuel and Power. When the coal mines were nationalised in 1947, he became Conciliation Officer for the National Coal Board Northern Division.

Election to Parliament
After Jack Lawson received a peerage in 1949, Bartley was selected to follow him as Labour candidate for Chester-le-Street. At the 1950 general election he was elected with a majority even bigger than Lawson's, 24,969. He used his position in Parliament to support nationalisation of the mines, arguing that it had produced a greater sense of communal responsibility than ever before. He also criticised discrimination against Roman Catholics in Northern Ireland.

During the 1951 general election campaign, Bartley was forced to go into hospital due to ill health; his campaign was conducted by volunteers. This proved no disadvantage as his majority of 24,879 was one of the highest in the country. In May 1952, Bartley's championing of the case of a constituent denied compassionate leave from the army to see his dying father was so forceful that the Prime Minister Winston Churchill had to step in to defend the Minister involved.

Death
Bartley also took up the issue of agricultural land in his constituency which had been lost to mining subsidence, and he continued to raise detailed issues about the mining industry. However, his health continued to be poor and he was again admitted to hospital in June 1956. Three days after his discharge, he died suddenly.

References
M. Stenton and S. Lees, "Who's Who of British MPs" Vol. IV (Harvester Press, 1981)
"Who Was Who", A & C Black

External links 
 

1909 births
1956 deaths
Councillors in County Durham
English miners
Labour Party (UK) MPs for English constituencies
National Union of Mineworkers-sponsored MPs
UK MPs 1950–1951
UK MPs 1951–1955
UK MPs 1955–1959
People from Washington, Tyne and Wear
Politicians from Tyne and Wear